Conopomorphina ochnivora is a moth of the family Gracillariidae. It is known from South Africa.

The larvae feed on Ochna pulchra. They mine the leaves of their host plant. The mine has the form of a moderate, irregular, transparent blotch-mine in young leaves.

References

Endemic moths of South Africa
Gracillariinae
Moths of Africa
Moths described in 1961